Letta is an Italian surname and an African given name. It may refer to:

Gianni Letta (born 1935), an Italian politician and member of Forza Italia
Enrico Letta (born 1966), Prime Minister of Italy
Lencho Letta, Ethiopian politician, activist and founding member of Oromo Liberation Front 
Letta Mbulu, a South African jazz singer

See also
Lettiani, the Democratic Party faction around Enrico Letta
Henrietta (Letta) Crapo Smith (1862-1921), American painter, granddaughter of the former Michigan Governor, Henry H. Crapo